Below is the list of Turkish women who won the international beauty pageants.

See also
 Women in Turkey

References

Turkish beauty pageant winners
Beauty pageants